Marcus Keith Randall (born March 14, 1982) is a former American football player. Randall played quarterback for LSU, Tennessee Titans and Green Bay Packers of the National Football League (NFL).

College career
Randall came to LSU from nearby Glen Oaks High School in Baton Rouge, Louisiana. His brother, Eric Randall, had been a well-known quarterback in the area, leading Southern University to a Black College National Championship in 1995. In 2002, Randall became the starting quarterback halfway through the season, after starter Matt Mauck was lost for the year with a broken foot. In 2003, he saw limited action behind Mauck during LSU's run to a BCS National Championship. In 2004, he started the majority of LSU's games, but split time with redshirt freshman JaMarcus Russell. During his career at LSU, Randall threw for 2,845 yards, 18 touchdowns and 12 interceptions. He also threw the game-winning touchdown against Kentucky in 2002, now known as the "Bluegrass Miracle".

Professional career

NFL
Randall was not selected in the 2005 NFL Draft. However, he did sign as an undrafted free agent with the Titans, who converted him first to safety and later linebacker. Randall played the final three games of the 2005 season with the Titans and made three tackles. The Titans cut him on September 2, 2006.

The Green Bay Packers signed him on February 20, 2007 and then released him on June 8, 2007.

AAFL
Randall was selected in inaugural AAFL draft by Arkansas to play quarterback.

References

1982 births
Living people
Players of American football from Baton Rouge, Louisiana
African-American players of American football
American football quarterbacks
American football safeties
LSU Tigers football players
Tennessee Titans players
Green Bay Packers players
21st-century African-American sportspeople
20th-century African-American people